Events in the year 1843 in Belgium.

Incumbents
Monarch: Leopold I
Prime Minister: Jean-Baptiste Nothomb

Events
 Pierre-Joseph van Beneden establishes the world's first marine laboratory in Ostend
 12 June – Parliamentary elections
 21 July – Antwerp Zoo established
 7 August – Border convention between Belgium and the Luxembourg concluded at Maastricht.
 8 August – Border convention between Belgium and the Netherlands concluded at Maastricht.

Publications
Periodicals
Almanach royal de Belgique (Brussels, Librairie Polytechnique)
 La Belgique judiciaire: gazette des tribunaux belges et étrangers
 Bulletin et Annales de l'Académie d'Archéologie de Belgique begins publication.
Journal historique et littéraire, vol. 10 (Liège, Pierre Kersten)
La renaissance: Chronique des arts et de la littérature, 4.
 Revue de Bruxelles changes title to Nouvelle Revue de Bruxelles.
 Revue nationale de Belgique, Vol. 9

Monographs and reports
 État de l'instruction moyenne en Belgique, 1830-1842
 Notice statistique sur les Journaux Belges: 1830-1842
 Edward Dobson, An Historical, Statistical, and Scientific Account of the Railways of Belgium from 1834 to 1842 (London, John Weale)
 Charles Marcellis, Coup d'oeuil sur la Belgique en 1843
 Pierre-Joseph Van Beneden, Recherches sur l'embryogénie des tubulaires
 Pierre-Joseph Van Beneden, Mémoire sur les campanulaires de la côte d'Ostende

Literature
 Henry Robert Addison, Belgium as she is (Brussels and Leipzig, C. Muquardt)
 Hendrik Conscience, Hoe men schilder wordt
 Hendrik Conscience, Wat een Moeder lijden kan

Births
18 March – Jules Vandenpeereboom, politician (died 1917)
26 April – Paul de Vigne, sculptor (died 1901)
13 May – Paul de Smet de Naeyer, politician (died 1913)
25 July – Edmond Hanssens, colonial administrator (died 1884)
19 September – Charles van der Stappen, sculptor (died 1910)

Deaths
2 March – François-Joseph-Philippe de Riquet (born 1771), prince of Chimay
12 December – William I of the Netherlands (born 1772), former head of state

References

 
1840s in Belgium